ThinkBook is a line of business-oriented laptop computers and tablets designed, developed and marketed by Lenovo.

The ThinkBook line is marketed towards small business users and gets the same market position as Lenovo's ThinkPad E series. The ThinkBook does not have a TrackPoint, physical touchpad buttons, and has a simplified keyboard layout. However, the ThinkBook has an aluminum case (instead of a plastic Thinkpad E case).

13s and 14s

The first product lineup launched in 2019 with the ThinkBook 13s and 14s. Both laptops include TPM 2.0 security chips, fingerprint readers, webcam shutters similar to those on ThinkPads, and dedicated buttons for Skype. They support 8th Generation Intel Core processors, AMD Radeon 540X graphics, M.2 SSD storage, USB-C Docks, and run Windows 10 Pro. The ThinkBook 13s has a 13-inch screen and the 14s has a 14-inch screen.

See also

 Lenovo IdeaPad
 IBM/Lenovo ThinkCentre
 IBM/Lenovo ThinkPad
 HP ProBook
 Dell Vostro

References

External links
 Official Lenovo ThinkBook website

Think
Consumer electronics brands
Computer-related introductions in 2019
Products introduced in 2019
Business laptops